I Want a Country Man is an album by American jazz vocalist Dakota Staton recorded in 1973 and released on the Groove Merchant label.

Reception 

Allmusic's Jason Ankeny said: "Dakota Staton's second Groove Merchant session refines the hip contemporary sound first introduced via the preceding Madame Foo Foo. Paired with arranger Manny Albam, she veers further away from conventional jazz sensibilities into soul, a move that perfectly complements her impassioned approach. Its earthy title notwithstanding, I Want a Country Man boasts an urbane stylishness that underscores the late-night ambience of the set. Albam's lovely arrangements serve both Staton and the material, adding depth and energy".

Track listing
 "Country Man" (Dakota Staton) – 3:57
 "I Love You More Than You'll Ever Know" (Al Kooper) – 6:17
 "Girl Talk" (Neal Hefti, Bobby Troup) – 3:23
 "Cry Me a River" (Arthur Hamilton) – 4:01
 "Heartbreak" (Joe Thomas) – 4:20
 "It's the Talk of the Town" (Jerry Livingston, Al J. Neiburg, Marty Symes) – 4:55
 "Make It Easy on Yourself" (Burt Bacharach, Hal David) – 4:22
 "How Did He Look?" (Abner Silver, Gladys Shelley) – 4:15

Personnel
Dakota Staton − vocals
Cecil Bridgewater, Marvin Stamm, Burt Collins, Joe Newman (tracks 4 & 6–8), Lew Soloff (tracks 1–3 & 5) − trumpet
Eddie Bert, Bill Watrous, Garnett Brown − trombone
Jerry Dodgion − soprano saxophone
Joe Firrantello − alto saxophone
Frank Wess (tracks 1–3 & 5), Eddie Daniels (tracks 4 & 6–8) − tenor saxophone
Pepper Adams − baritone saxophone 
Unidentified rhythm section
Manny Albam − arranger, conductor

References

Groove Merchant albums
Dakota Staton albums
1973 albums
Albums produced by Sonny Lester
Albums arranged by Manny Albam
Albums conducted by Manny Albam